Morwyn (also known as Carolina de Silva and C. L. Dow) is an American author.

Career 
Morwyn has taught at several universities, including the University of Colorado (Professor and Lecturer of Portuguese and Spanish), University of Pittsburgh, and Brown University for 15 years. 

She is a member of the Colorado Authors League, Mystery Writers of America and has been President of the Rocky Mountain Chapter of Sisters in Crime.

Under her pen name, Carolina de Silva, she co-authored a series of four books in Spanish on Wicca and Magick within a fictional framework. She has written thirteen books on the occult and other New Age topics. Two books, Complete Book of the Psychic Arts and Fuego Angelical, have received national writing awards. She also writes mystery novels under the pen name C. L. Dow. In addition, she has written three books about Brazilian folk religions.

Education 
She holds a B.A. in Latin American Studies from the University of Colorado, an M.A. in Spanish, and a Ph.D. in Portuguese and Brazilian Studies from the University of Wisconsin. She was a member of three honor societies: Phi Alpha Theta, Sigma Delta Pi, and Phi Beta Kappa.

Personal life 
Morwyn is a Wiccan priestess and a ceremonial magician. She has lived in multiple countries and speaks five languages. As of 2009 she lived in Colorado.

Bibliography

 The Complete Book Of Psychic Arts: Divination Practices From Around the World (1999) Llewellyn Publications , 
 Green Magic: The Healing Power of Herbs, Talismans, & Stones (2000) Schiffer Publishing , 
 Magic From Brazil: Recipes, Spells & Rituals (2001) Llewellyn Publications , 
 Web of Light: Rites for Witches in the New Age (2000) Schiffer Publishing , 
 Witch's Brew: Secrets of Scents (2000) Whitford Press , 
 Secrets of a Witch's Coven (1988) Whitford Press , 
 Tales From the Inside (2007) Lulu.com ,

As Carolina de Silva 

 Solo Prenda una Vela (Candle magic) by Carolina de Silva (September 1, 2001) Llewellyn Espanol , 
 Fuego Angelical: Magia, Leyendas y Tradiciones by Doña Carolina de Silva & Ralph Kite
 Sacred Spaces: Transform Any Space into a Sanctuary for Relaxation, Inspiration, and Rejuvenation (2004) Adams Media 
  Esencia De La Aromaterapia (Essence of Aromatherapy) Llewellyn Español , 
 Caminos A La Prosperidad (Roads to Prosperity) Llewellyn Español 
 Tesoros De La Cueva De Cristal (Treasures of the Crystal Cave) Dunraven House Publishing
 Sacred Spaces''Adams Media

Notes

External links
 Morwyn's website (archive)

Living people
American mystery writers
American occult writers
American Wiccans
Herbalists
Wiccan priestesses
University of Colorado alumni
University of Wisconsin–Madison College of Letters and Science alumni
Brown University faculty
University of Pittsburgh faculty
American women novelists
Women mystery writers
Novelists from Pennsylvania
Wiccan novelists
American women non-fiction writers
American women academics
21st-century pseudonymous writers
Pseudonymous women writers
Year of birth missing (living people)
21st-century American women